Astronidium saccatum is a species of plant in the family Melastomataceae. It is endemic to French Polynesia.

References

Flora of French Polynesia
saccatum
Least concern plants
Taxonomy articles created by Polbot